NEMCO Motorsports  is an American professional stock car racing team that last competed in the NASCAR Camping World Truck Series. The team is owned by driver Joe Nemechek and his family. NEMCO Motorsports has had success, winning the 1992 Busch Series Championship. The team previously competed in both Cup and Nationwide Series competition. NEMCO currently competes in late models.

NASCAR Cup Series

Car No. 87, 49 history

NEMCO made its Winston Cup debut during the 1993 season at the Slick 50 300, where Nemechek started fifteenth and finished 36th in the No. 87 car. NEMCO ran two more races with Nemechek that year, at Watkins Glen and Michigan, where he finished 21st and 37th, respectively. NEMCO did not race in the series again until the 1995 season, when Nemechek moved the operation up to Cup full-time. With sponsorship from Burger King, Nemechek posted four top-tens and finished 28th in points. The next season, he had just two top-tens and dropped to 34th in points. After he signed with SABCO Racing, Nemechek abandoned the team's Cup program, and sold the equipment to the SABCO team.

NEMCO returned to the Winston Cup Series in 1999, fielding the No. 87 Bully Hill Vineyards Chevrolet Monte Carlo driven by Ron Fellows at Watkins Glen. Fellows started seventh, led three laps, and finished in second place. Fellows ran at Watkins Glen again the following year, but suffered a blown engine and finished 43rd. During the 2001 season, Fellows began running Watkins Glen as well the series' other road course at Sears Point International Raceway. He led the most laps, but finished 38th after wrecking at Sears Point, and 42nd at Watkins Glen after suffering axle problems. Fellows' last race for NEMCO came in 2002 at Sears Point, where he started 19th and finished 25th. Fellows left NEMCO after the 2002 series to drive for Dale Earnhardt Incorporated in 2003.

NEMCO did not field a Cup car again until 2005 at Sears Point, when it leased a car to Christine Marie Motorsports to be driven by Chris Cook. He started and finished 28th. The team also attempted Watkins Glen that year, but failed to qualify.

NEMCO returned to race full-time in the 2009 season with Joe Nemechek following his departure from  Furniture Row Racing. The car was leased to Scott Speed and the Red Bull Racing Team for two races when Speed did not qualify.

In 2010, Nemechek ran a full season, but only managed to finish one race, due to funding issues. Nemechek secured sponsorship through England Stove Works for the Daytona 500 and succeeded in qualifying, but wrecked during the race. For the fall Talladega race, sponsorship was provided by HostGator.com. They also sponsored the car in the second Texas race, but engine failure took the car out early.

For 2011, the team is back full-time yet again. Nemechek qualified for the Daytona 500, being the fastest Toyota in the field. An early accident took the car out of the 500 early though. Sponsorship was provided by AM FM Energy, and DAB Constructors for Daytona Speedweeks. Despite starting and parking most of the season, Nemechek managed to qualify for all 36 races.

For 2012, the team plans to remain full-time. Except for the Daytona 500 and Watkins Glen, the team was a Start and Park ride to fund the No. 87 Nationwide Team. For 2013, NEMCO and Jay Robinson Racing have partnered up for the No. 87. The No. 87 qualified for the 2013 Daytona 500 but were knocked out due to an engine failure. They currently have sponsorship from Maddie's Place Rocks, with no plans to start and park. Royal Teak Collections has stepped up as primary sponsorship. The same plans are in place for 2014. The No. 87 is part of the January test session in Daytona. On January 31, 2014, Michael Waltrip Racing announced a partnership with Robinson and Nat Hardwick to run the No. 66 full-time as Identity Ventures Racing.  NEMCO-JRR moved most of their Cup cars to Identity's shop, owned by Robinson, with Nemechek as primary driver for the new team. NEMCO-JRR still entered the No. 87 part-time when Nemechek was not scheduled to drive for Identity.

The No. 87, with Nemechek driving, failed to qualify for the Daytona 500 and the Kobalt 400 at Las Vegas, while Morgan Shepherd finished 43rd at Phoenix.  The team did not enter again until Talladega, where Nemechek once again failed to qualify. Timmy Hill ran in the No. 87 at New Hampshire. Mike Wallace was initially entered in the No. 87 in the fall race at Talladega, but the number was changed mid-week to the 49, the number Robinson used for many years. The car still used the owner points and attempts from the No. 87 in 2014. Wallace ultimately qualified in 23rd place. NEMCO Motorsports has no affiliation with Identity Ventures Racing or Jay Robinson Racing after Nemechek split from the team and Nat Hardwick, the team's co-owner, was facing embezzlement charges involving his companies Morris-Hardwick-Schneider and Landcastle Title. Should the No. 87 return, the team will probably run Chevrolets like in the Trucks. The No. 87 announced plans to return to the Cup Series in 2015, but withdrew for the Daytona 500 and hasn't run a race since.

Car No. 87, 49 results

Car No. 97 history
A second car, the No. 97, was entered in the 2010 Daytona 500 as a safety net for Joe Nemechek, and was driven by Jeff Fuller, but did not qualify for the race. Fuller parked the car about 5 laps into his Duel race. However, Fuller qualified for the October event in Talladega. Nemechek stated that if both cars qualified (which they did) the No. 97 would start and park, and with the winnings from that car, and the sponsorship from HostGator.com, the No. 87 would be able to run the entire race.

In 2011, Kevin Conway ran the Bud Shootout in the No. 97 with longtime sponsor ExtenZe, but was wrecked early on. He also attempted the Daytona 500, but failed to qualify. Conway did qualify for the Aaron's 499 at Talladega, but only ran one lap and then retired from the race.  Conway again qualified for the Coke Zero 400, but also again ran one lap and then retired from the race. Conway then attempted the Good Sam RV Club 500 in Talladega and made the race. However like in the previous races, Conway pulled the car in after completing one lap.

Bill Elliott has taken over the No. 97 car in 2012 with sponsorship from AM/FM Energy for the 2012 Daytona 500. Neither car is locked in the race and Elliott failed to qualify. Elliott successfully qualified for the Talladega spring race, and was in and out of the garage for most of the race. Timmy Hill qualified the car at the fall Talladega race, starting and parking the machine.

Car No. 97 results

Xfinity Series

Car No. 88, 87 history
The original car in the NEMCO stable, the No. 87 car debuted in 1989 at North Carolina Speedway as the No. 88 Buick with Nemechek finishing 33rd after an engine failure. The car switched to the No. 87 and ran full-time in 1990 with sponsorship from Master Machine & Tool. Nemechek had five top-tens and was named NASCAR Busch Series Rookie of the Year. After jumping to sixth in points the following year, Nemechek and the team won two races and the Busch Series championship in 1992.

After Nemechek failed to win the championship again in 1993, he left for Larry Hedrick Motorsports at the Winston Cup level. He continued to drive the No. 87 part-time in the Busch Series for several years. After winning the Hardee's 250 in 1994, Nemechek did not win until 1997, when he won the Carquest Auto Parts 300 and the Jiffy Lube Miami 300 in the BellSouth sponsored car.

Beginning in 1998, Nemechek began sharing the car with Ron Fellows. Fellows picked up his first win that year at the Lysol 200, then finished second the next year to Dale Earnhardt Jr., before winning at Watkins Glen the next two years. In 2000, the team got new sponsorship from Cellular One, and Nemechek went on to win three races in 2003. Ron Fellows left the team to drive for Dale Earnhardt Incorporated after 2002.

In 2002, David Reutimann drove the No. 87 for four races, his best finish a twelfth at Memphis. The next year, Hendrick Motorsports development driver Kyle Busch climbed on board for a number of races with ditech sponsorship, posting two runner-up finishes. Reutimann also drove the No. 87 for a few races in 2003, finishing in fifth place twice. Nemechek shared the No. 87 with Reutimann again in the early parts of 2004, before Reutimann left. Midseason, Hendrick development drivers Blake Feese and Boston Reid drove for a handful of races in the No. 87. Feese's best finish was a 33rd at Indianapolis Raceway Park, and Reid's a 26th at Atlanta Motor Speedway. Nemechek picked up a win that season at Kansas Speedway. His lone highlight of 2005 was winning the pole at the season-opening race at Daytona. Ron Fellows returned to the No. 87 at Autodromo Hermanos Rodriguez, where he finished 41st after a wreck.

In 2006, NEMCO ran two races with Nemechek at Daytona and Homestead, where he started finished fortieth and twenty-third, respectively. He ran three of the first four races in 2007 with Brunton Vineyards sponsoring, with a best finish of thirteenth.

The No. 87 came back full-time in 2009. Nemechek drove most of the races with Chad Blount, Dave Blaney, Mike Bliss, Kevin Conway and Jeff Fuller filling in throughout the year for various races. Towards the end of the season, funding got tight and Nemechek was forced to Start and Park most of the races.

In 2010, Nemechek returned to the No. 87 for most of the season with Jarit Johnson, Antonio Perez, and Paulie Harraka driving in the races he did not take part in. However, Nemechek did run the No. 97 while Harraka was wheeling the No. 87 in Montreal. The team received sponsorship from various companies through the first 17 events before HostGator became the primary sponsor for the rest of the season.

For the 2011 DRIVE4COPD 300, Nemechek ran the No. 87 car with DAB Constructors as the sponsor. The team has received other sponsorship from Sin City Motorsports, and AM FM Energy in other various races. HostGator made their first appearance on the car at the spring race in Texas. The team is slowly transitioning to Toyota Camrys, although they have run Chevrolet Impalas off and on throughout the year thus far. With both the No. 87 and the No. 97 entered for the annual race in Las Vegas, it was impossible to change the No. 97 back to a No. 87 after Joe crashed the No. 87 in practice. So, Joe took the wheel of the No. 97 while Kevin Conway started and parked the No. 87 as a backup Jay Robinson car. Nemechek took the reins of the No. 97 again a couple of weeks later in California, while Conway drove the No. 87 with sponsorship from Extenze. Kimi Räikkönen drove the No. 87 at Charlotte Motor Speedway in May 2011, in alliance with Kyle Busch Motorsports.

In 2012 and 2013, Nemechek drove the No. 87 car himself for the full season.

In 2014, with NEMCO focusing on the Truck series, the team only fielded the No. 87 part-time. Nemechek himself drove the car in a few races, as did Carlos Contreras. In the races when NEMCO did not field the car, Rick Ware Racing, RAB Racing, and JD Motorsports used the owner's points to field an additional car for their own teams. The No. 87 car made one attempt in 2015, missing the race at Daytona in February. The No. 87 car returned for 2016 as a Toyota. They would only make the two Daytona races, and after a crash at the second race, they have not made a race since.

Car No. 88, 87 results

Car No. 88 history
The No. 88 car debuted in 2001 at California Speedway with Jeff Fuller as the driver. He started 40th and finished 42nd after an early vibration problem. The car returned at Daytona in 2002 with Fuller as the driver. He started fifth, but finished 42nd after being involved in a wreck early in the race. He ran again that year at Talladega, but crashed again and finished 40th. Fuller and Nemechek ran three races apiece in the No. 88 the following year, finishing last in each one, while Reutimann had a sixth-place finish at Michigan Speedway.

In 2004, Fuller moved to the No. 88 virtually full-time. Despite the full-time schedule, Fuller did not finish a race all year long, his best finish being a 35th at Nazareth Speedway. Nemechek and Wally Dallenbach Jr. drove one race apiece in the car during that season.

In 2005, the team's owners points were transferred to the 7 car's, which were sold to GIC-Mixon Motorsports.

The No. 88 team is now currently used by JR Motorsports, since 2005.

Car No. 7, 97 history
NEMCO debuted its No. 7 car in 2001. Co-owned with Ed Evans and run under the Evans Motorsports name, it was driven by Randy LaJoie and sponsored by Kleenex. The car won its first race at Daytona International Speedway. LaJoie won another race that season at Memphis Motorsports Park and finished twelfth in points. LaJoie didn't win in 2002, but won a pole at Gateway International Raceway and posted fourteen top-tens on his way to an eleventh-place points finish. Following the 2003 GNC Live Well 250, LaJoie and NEMCO parted ways. Nemechek, Todd Bodine, Hank Parker Jr., and Mike Skinner all took over for one race apiece before Greg Biffle was hired for the rest of the season, winning twice and garnering three pole positions.

In 2004, the No. 7 only ran twice, once with Nemechek and once with Todd Szegedy. Szegedy's qualifying run at Chicagoland was famously interrupted by a giant inflatable Tropicana orange, an advertisement at the track. Szegedy was granted a second qualifying run and timed in a surprising 12th.

The No. 7 car ran more races in 2005 although it was still part-time and suffered from a lack of reliable equipment in comparison to the primary No. 87. Jeff Fuller was the primary driver, with Kim Crosby and others filling out the schedule.

In 2010, NEMCO began fielding a second car part-time with Fuller as the driver. In 2011 and 2012, the No. 97 was mainly used when there was another driver in the No. 87 and was fielded for Nemechek in that situation.

The No. 97 ran as the No. 70 in 2013 when ML Motorsports was not entered, including Jeff Green, Brad Teague, Tomy Drissi, Derrike Cope and Tony Raines. The No. 97 returned with Nemechek driving at the summer Daytona race in 2014.

The No. 97 team was most recently used by the team Obaika Racing, when it debuted in 2015. Currently, no team uses the 97.

Camping World Truck Series

Truck No. 8 history
The No. 8 truck was originally owned and driven by Joe Nemechek's brother John. He debuted the truck in 1996 at the Miami-Dade Homestead Motorsports Complex, where he finished seventh. He ran full-time that year and finished 13th in points. The team was known as CHEK Racing Inc. Three races into 1997, John was involved in a single-truck accident at Miami-Dade and suffered massive head injuries, which claimed his life five days later. The No. 8 truck was retired in John's memory after this, and it was intended that the number would not be used again by the Nemecheks.

However, in 2014, the number returned with Joe Nemechek's son John Hunter Nemechek (named after Joe's brother) ran the No. 8 Toyota Tundra in 10 races, with Joe driving the other 12. SWM sponsored the truck, with SWM owner Sid Maudlin also owning a share of the truck team. The events on the younger Nemechek's NCWTS calendar include Martinsville in March and October, Dover in May, Gateway Motorsports Park in June, Iowa in July, Eldora Speedway in July, Bristol in August, Canadian Tire Motorsport Park in August, New Hampshire in September and Phoenix in November. NEMCO experienced a renewed success, with a best finish of 3rd at Texas by the elder Nemechek. The team recorded eleven top-10s and only finished outside the top-15 on two occasions. The No. 8 finished 7th in owner points, the highest finish for a NEMCO team in any series in nearly 20 years.

In 2015, the season began with the truck again being split between Joe Nemechek and John Hunter Nemechek. Ryan Newman also ran a race for the team at Kansas. Beginning at the eighth race of the season at Gateway, John Hunter took over the truck full-time. At Chicagoland in September, John Hunter Nemechek won his first Truck Series race, passing Kyle Larson with two laps to go after Larson ran out of fuel. It was the first win for NEMCO in any series since a Busch Series race at Kansas in October 2004. Team co-owner Sid Maudlin died in December 2015 at the age of 61.

John Hunter Nemechek returned to the team for 2016, running the full schedule. Nemechek held off Cameron Hayley to win at Atlanta, his second career win. John Hunter Nemechek also won at the Canadian Tire Motorsport Park in a controversial finish beating Cole Custer by 0.034 seconds 

It was announced in 2017, NEMCO Motorsports would be fielding a 2nd truck driven by Joe Nemechek in the No. 87 Fleetwing Chevrolet, the first time a father and son competed in a truck series race since Dave Blaney and Ryan Blaney at Eldora in 2013. After finishing 29th, 28th, 22nd, and 21st at the beginning of the season, John Hunter Nemechek got his 1st win of the season at Gateway, he followed that up with a win at Iowa the very next race. Joe and John Hunter will split the 8 now that the younger Nemechek has moved to a partial schedule driving for Chip Ganassi Racing in the Xfinity Series. Financial problems hit the team in 2019, forcing the 8 to start and park several races when John Hunter was not entered, or Joe was unable to find sufficient sponsorship. 2020 saw the 8s schedule greatly reduced as both teams, the 8 and 87, missed the show at Daytona with John Hunter and Joe. The #8 attempted five more races, one with Mike Skeen, one with Joe Nemechek  and the other three with JH Nemechek. He scored a top-10 finish at Charlotte Motor Speedway, climbing all the way from 38th to 6th by the end of the event. Skeen finished 23rd at the Daytona Road Course, while Joe Nemechek finished 37th at Talladega after an early crash eliminated him. Rumors circulated that NEMCO had no plans of attempting any races in 2021. These were later debunked by Joe Nemechek, who shared on his Instagram that he would attempt the season opening race at Daytona. Despite not making the race, NEMCO would run the second race of the season with Camden Murphy, finishing 13th. Following the Daytona Road Course Race, NEMCO sold its owner points to the no. 11 Spencer Davis Motorsports team.

Truck No. 8 results

Truck No. 22 history
It was announced in the fall 2013, that John Hunter Nemechek would make his NASCAR debut in the October Martinsville truck race in the No. 22 Toyota Tundra, co-owned by Joe Nemechek and Sid Maudlin under the name SWM-NEMCO Motorsports.

Truck No. 22 results

Truck No. 87 history
NEMCO began running the No. 87 truck in 1995 with John Nemechek driving with sponsorship from Burger King and Delco Remy America. John had two top-tens and finished 16th in points despite not competing in four races. Joe took over the No. 87 the following year on a part-time basis. He finished second at Watkins Glen after Steve Park qualified on the pole in the truck, then finished eighth at Phoenix International Raceway. After finishing 27th at Walt Disney World Speedway in 1997, Nemechek didn't return to the trucks until the following year, where he finished sixth at WDWS. Fellows began racing the truck in 1999, finishing third in his debut at Portland International Raceway before winning the following week at Watkins Glen. Nemechek did make an announcement in early June that later in the season, a second truck would be run with Joe driving. The truck was rumored to be numbered as the 87. Ultimately, this truck never ran a race. In January 2017, NEMCO announced that Joe Nemechek and the No. 87 truck would return part-time for the 2017 season, beginning with the NextEra Energy Resources 250 at Daytona, and will be sponsored by Fleetwing. The 87 returned with Joe Nemechek at Gateway, Iowa, and Kentucky. Nemechek failed to qualify at Kentucky and skipped Eldora. The 87 returned at Pocono. The 87 has recently run as a start and park to fund the primary 8 for John Hunter Nemechek. On October 21, 2017 it was announced that Ty Dillon would run in the 87 at Martinsville Speedway without start and parking. The 87 returned at Daytona with Joe Nemechek behind the wheel, before he moved to the 8 truck. It was announced that Tyler Ankrum would run select races in the 87 truck to maintain his playoff eligibility for 2019. He ran 2 races at Iowa and Gateway, finishing 31st and 30th. 2020 saw the 87 only attempt one race, the season opener at Daytona, which resulted in a DNQ with Joe Nemechek at the wheel.

Truck No. 87 results

References

External links
NEMCO Motorsports Official Web Page
Joe Nemechek Owner Statistics

1989 establishments in North Carolina
American auto racing teams
Companies based in North Carolina
NASCAR teams
Auto racing teams established in 1989